Čistá is a municipality and village in Rakovník District in the Central Bohemian Region of the Czech Republic. It has about 900 inhabitants.

Administrative parts
Villages of Křekovice, Kůzová, Lhota, Nová Ves, Smrk, Strachovice and Zdeslav are administrative parts of Čistá.

References

Villages in Rakovník District